
Gmina Cielądz is a rural gmina (administrative district) in Rawa County, Łódź Voivodeship, in central Poland.

Villages
Gmina Cielądz contains the villages and settlements of Brzozówka, Cielądz, Gortatowice, Grabice, Gułki, Komorów, Kuczyzna, Łaszczyn, Mała Wieś, Mroczkowice, Niemgłowy, Ossowice, Parolice, Sanogoszcz, Sierzchowy, Stolniki, Wisówka, Wylezinek and Zuski.

Neighbouring gminas
Gmina Cielądz is bordered by the gminas of Czerniewice, Nowe Miasto nad Pilicą, Rawa Mazowiecka, Regnów, Rzeczyca and Sadkowice.

References
Polish official population figures 2006

Cieladz
Rawa County